Sokołda is a river in east Poland in Podlaskie Voivodeship, a tributary of the Supraśl River, with a length of 57.5 kilometres and a basin area of 464 km2.

Tributaries 
Major tributaries of Sokołda are:
 Poganica
 Jałówka
 Kamionka

Rivers of Poland
Rivers of Podlaskie Voivodeship